Rationing is the controlled distribution of scarce resources, goods, or services, or an artificial restriction of demand. Rationing controls the size of the ration, which is one person's allotted portion of the resources being distributed on a particular day or at a particular time.

Rationing in the United States was introduced in stages during World War II.

World War I

Although the United States did not have food rationing in World War I, it relied heavily on propaganda campaigns to persuade people to curb their food consumption.

World War II

In the summer of 1941, rationing in the United Kingdom increased because of military needs, and German attacks on shipping in the Battle of the Atlantic. The British government appealed to Americans to conserve food to help the UK. The Office of Price Administration (OPA) warned Americans of potential gasoline, steel, aluminum, and electricity shortages. It believed that with factories converting to military production and consuming many critical supplies, rationing would become necessary if the country entered the war. The OPA established a rationing system after the attack on Pearl Harbor on 7 December.

Ration books, stamps, and tokens

The work of issuing ration books and exchanging used stamps for certificates was handled by some 5,500 local ration boards of mostly volunteer workers selected by local officials. Many levels of rationing went into effect. Some items, such as sugar, were distributed evenly based on the number of people in a household. Other items, like gasoline or fuel oil, were rationed only to those who could justify a need. Restaurant owners and other merchants were accorded more availability, but had to collect ration stamps to restock their supplies. In exchange for used ration stamps, ration boards delivered certificates to restaurants and merchants to authorize procurement of more products.

Each ration stamp had a generic drawing of an airplane, gun, tank, aircraft carrier, ear of wheat, fruit, etc. and a serial number. Some stamps also had alphabetic lettering. The kind and amount of rationed commodities were not specified on most of the stamps and were not defined until later when local newspapers published, for example, that beginning on a specified date, one airplane stamp was required (in addition to cash) to buy one pair of shoes and one stamp number 30 from ration book four was required to buy five pounds of sugar. The commodity amounts changed from time to time depending on availability. Red stamps were used to ration meat and butter, and blue stamps were used to ration processed foods.

To enable making change for ration stamps, the government issued "red point" tokens to be given in change for red stamps, and "blue point" tokens in change for blue stamps. The red and blue tokens were about the size of dimes and were made of thin compressed wood fiber material, because metals were in short supply.

There was a black market in stamps. To prevent this, the OPA ordered vendors not to accept stamps that they themselves did not tear out of books. Buyers, however, circumvented this by saying (sometimes accurately, as the books were not well-made) that the stamps had "fallen out". In actuality, they may have acquired stamps from other family members or friends, or the black market.

Most rationing restrictions ended in August 1945 except for sugar rationing, which lasted until 1947 in some parts of the country.

Tires, gasoline, and automobiles
Tires were the first item to be rationed by the OPA, which ordered the temporary end of sales on 11 December 1941 while it created 7,500 unpaid, volunteer three-person tire ration boards around the country. By 5 January 1942 the boards were ready. Each received a monthly allotment of tires based on the number of local vehicle registrations, and allocated them to applicants based on OPA rules. There was a shortage of natural rubber for tires since the Japanese quickly conquered the rubber-producing regions of Southeast Asia. Although synthetic rubber had been invented before the war, it had been unable to compete with natural rubber commercially, so the US did not have enough manufacturing capacity at the start of the war to make synthetic rubber. Throughout the war, rationing of gasoline was motivated by a desire to conserve rubber as much as by a desire to conserve gasoline.

The War Production Board (WPB) ordered the temporary end of all civilian automobile sales on 1 January 1942, leaving dealers with one half million unsold cars. Ration boards grew in size as they began evaluating automobile sales in February (only certain professions, such as doctors and clergymen, qualified to purchase the remaining inventory of new automobiles), typewriters in March, and bicycles in May. Automobile factories stopped manufacturing civilian models by early February 1942 and converted to producing tanks, aircraft, weapons, and other military products, with the United States government as the only customer.

A national speed limit of 35 miles per hour was imposed to save fuel and rubber for tires. Later that month volunteers again helped distribute gasoline cards in 17 Atlantic and Pacific Northwest states.

To get a classification and rationing stamps, one had to appear before a local War Price and Rationing Board which reported to the OPA. Each person in a household received a ration book, including babies and small children who qualified for canned milk not available to others. To receive a gasoline ration card, a person had to certify a need for gasoline and ownership of no more than five tires. All tires in excess of five per driver were confiscated by the government, because of rubber shortages.

"C" stickers were granted to persons deemed very essential to the war effort, such as doctors. Motorcycles had D papers and motorcycle users who were essential to the war got "M" papers. "E" and "R" stickers applied to small and heavy highway machinery, respectively. "T" stickers were made available for truckers. Lastly, "X" stickers on cars entitled the holder to unlimited supplies and were the highest priority in the system. Clergy, police, firemen, and civil defense workers were in this category. A scandal erupted when 200 Congressmen received these X stickers. Referring to the lowest tier of this system, American motorists jokingly said that OPA stood for “Only a Puny A-Card.”

As a result of the gasoline rationing, all forms of automobile racing, including the Indianapolis 500, were banned. Sightseeing driving was also banned. In some regions breaking the gas rationing was so prevalent that night courts were set up to supplement the number of violators caught; the first gasoline-ration night court was created at Pittsburgh's Fulton Building on May 26, 1943.

With the pending capitulation of Japan, the printing of ration books for 1946 was halted by the OPA on August 13, 1945. It was thought that "even if Japan does not fold now, the war will certainly be over before the books can be used".

On August 15, 1945, World War II gas rationing was ended on the West Coast of the United States.

From the time that the United States entered the war to the August 1945 Japanese surrender, there was a dramatic shift in behavior: Americans drove cars less, carpooled when they did drive, walked and used their bicycles more, and increased the use of public transportation. Between 1941 and 1944 the total amount of gas consumed from highway use in the United States dropped to 32 percent. The federal agency named the Office of Defense Transportation (ODT) was established during the war to focus on controlling  domestic transportation and was responsible for collecting data, conducting research and analysis, setting goals for fuel consumption and helping determine rationing coupon values. ODT-imposed rationing of gasoline to civilians caused car owners to drive less, thus extending tire life and conserving fuel to maximize the oil and rubber available for military use.

In January 1942 there was a study published by the Public Roads Administration that discovered that driving 35 m.p.h helped tires last four times as long than if the speed was 65 m.p.h. In order to extend the lifespan of tires and reduce the use, the ODT contacted the governors of all the states to establish lower speed limits. In March of the same year to decrease the large amount of single occupied drivers, car sharing programs were encouraged for workplaces that had more than 100 employees from the ODT and the Highway Traffic Advisory Committee.

Food and consumer goods
Civilians first received ration books—War Ration Book Number One, or the "Sugar Book"—on 4 May 1942, through more than 100,000 schoolteachers, PTA groups, and other volunteers. 

Bakeries, ice cream makers, and other commercial users received rations of about 70% of normal usage. Coffee was rationed nationally on 29 November 1942 to  every five weeks, about half of normal consumption, in part because of German attacks on shipping from Brazil.

As of 1 March 1942, dog food could no longer be sold in tin cans, and manufacturers switched to dehydrated versions. As of 1 April 1942, anyone wishing to purchase a new toothpaste tube, then made from metal, had to turn in an empty one. By June 1942 companies also stopped manufacturing metal office furniture, radios,  television sets, phonographs, refrigerators, vacuum cleaners, washing machines, and sewing machines for civilians.

By the end of 1942, ration coupons were used for nine other items: typewriters, gasoline, bicycles, shoes, rubber footwear, silk, nylon, fuel oil, and stoves. Meat, lard, shortening and food oils, cheese, butter, margarine, processed foods (canned, bottled, and frozen), dried fruits, canned milk, firewood and coal, jams, jellies, and fruit butter were rationed by November 1943. Many retailers welcomed rationing because they were already experiencing shortages of many items due to rumors and panics, such as flashlights and batteries after Pearl Harbor. Ration Book Number Five is a very rare ration book, only issued to very few people.

Medicines
Scarce medicines such as penicillin were rationed by triage officers in the US military during World War II. Civilian hospitals received only small amounts of penicillin during the war, because it was not mass-produced for civilian use until after the war. A triage panel at each hospital decided which patients would receive the penicillin.

Gallery

See also
Rationing
Rationing in the United Kingdom
Ration stamp

References

External links

What's Happened to Sugar? - 1945 film from the Office of Price Administration that explains why sugar rationing had to continue after the end of the war
Ration Coupons on the Home Front, 1942-1945 - Duke University Libraries Digital Collections
World War II Rationing on the U.S. homefront, illustrated - Ames Historical Society
Links to 1940s newspaper clippings on rationing, primarily World War II War Ration Books - Genealogy Today
Tax Rationing
Recipe for Victory:Food and Cooking in Wartime
Point Rationing of Foods - An animated illustration of the World War II point rationing system.

United States
Economy of the United States
Regulation in the United States
United States home front during World War II
Food politics